Dichomeris furia is a moth in the family Gelechiidae. It was described by Ronald W. Hodges in 1986. It is found in North America, where it has been recorded from Illinois, Connecticut, Massachusetts, Georgia, Missouri and New York.

References

Moths described in 1986
furia
Moths of North America